The 2020 FIBA Men's Olympic Qualifying Tournament in Kaunas was one of four 2020 FIBA Men's Olympic Qualifying Tournaments. The tournament was held in Kaunas, Lithuania. It was originally scheduled to take place from 23 to 28 June 2020 but was postponed due to the COVID-19 pandemic, to 29 June to 4 July 2021.

Teams

Venue

Squads

Preliminary round
All times are local (UTC+3).

Group A

Group B

Final round

Semi-finals

Final

Final ranking

References

External links
Official website
Tournament summary

Qualifying
2019–20 in Lithuanian basketball
International basketball competitions hosted by Lithuania
Sports competitions in Kaunas
Impact of the COVID-19 pandemic on the 2020 Summer Olympics
June 2021 sports events in Europe
July 2021 sports events in Europe